Bon Voyage is a 2003 French film directed by Jean-Paul Rappeneau starring Isabelle Adjani and Gérard Depardieu.  It is very loosely inspired by Professor Lew Kowarski's smuggling of the world's only supplies of heavy water out of France following its occupation by the Nazis.

Plot
In 1940, film star Viviane Denvert sits in the audience of a premiere of her new movie and notices a man who keeps staring at her. She is disturbed, and when the film is over and the audience has finished praising her, she rushes home, discovering she is pursued by the same man. He chases her into her apartment.

An hour later, Frédéric Auger, a young writer, receives a call from Viviane, who was his childhood crush. Viviane, who has long used Frédéric's devotion, asks him to come to her apartment immediately.

Upon arriving, he discovers a corpse, "accidentally" killed, which Viviane asks him to dispose of, claiming that the man had been harassing her and when she slapped him, he fell over the edge of the balcony. He agrees to help her and the two pack the corpse into the trunk of his car; however, as it is raining, he accidentally drives into a curb and hits a police signalling device. The trunk opens upon impact, revealing the dead body to the arriving police, and Frédéric is arrested and sent to prison. On the eve of the German occupation of Paris, all of the city's citizens evacuate, including the prisoners. Prisoners are paired up with another and handcuffed together. Frédéric and his cellmate Raoul take advantage of the confusion to escape. Frédéric takes the train to Bordeaux, where he learns that Viviane is. Raoul is also on the train and he leads Frédéric to a seat near another girl, Camille. Camille, a physicist, works at the elite College de France under Professor Kopolski; the two of them are guarding French stocks of heavy water that they want to ship to England before the Germans can get their hands on it.

The remainder of the film traces the action-packed adventures of the characters, caught between two forces - the German invasion and Viviane's capacity for melodrama.  Some decide to stay in France while others go underground or escape to London. In a very short scene, a quite recognizable General Charles de Gaulle is told "Bon voyage" by one of the protagonists .

Frédéric eventually falls for Camille. At the end of the film, he returns from England and meets with Camille at an outdoor café. When the Germans see them, they flee and sneak into a movie theatre. When Frédéric sees one of the Germans enter the theater in search for them, he turns and kisses Camille. They stop once their pursuers leave. Frédéric looks up at the screen and sees Viviane singing and dancing. Frédéric turns to Camille, and they resume kissing as the film ends.

Cast
 Isabelle Adjani: Viviane Denvert
 Gérard Depardieu: Jean-Étienne Beaufort
 Virginie Ledoyen: Camille
 Yvan Attal: Raoul
 Grégori Derangère: Frédéric Auger
 Peter Coyote: Alex Winckler
 Aurore Clément: Jacqueline de Lusse
 Édith Scob: Madame Arbesault
 Michel Vuillermoz: Monsieur Girard
 Nicolas Vaude: Thierry Arpel
 Jean-Marc Stehlé: Professor Kopolski

Awards

 Nominations for best costumes, best director, best editing, best film, best original score, best sound editing, best supporting actor, and best writing at the 2004 César Awards.
 Awards for best photography, best set design, and best young hopeful actor (Grégori Derangère) at the 2004 Césars.

References

External links
 
 
 

2003 films
2003 black comedy films
French black comedy films
French World War II films
2000s French-language films
French war comedy films
Films set in Paris
Films set in Bordeaux
Films directed by Jean-Paul Rappeneau
Sony Pictures Classics films
Films scored by Gabriel Yared
Cultural depictions of Charles de Gaulle
Films with screenplays by Jean-Paul Rappeneau
Films set in 1940
2003 comedy films
2000s French films